Oleksandr Serhiyovych Melnyk (born 10 February 2000) is a Ukrainian professional footballer who plays as a defender for Oleksandriya.

Career
Born in Kyiv, Melnyk is a product of his native Dynamo Kyiv sportive school system. His first trainers were Yuriy Yeskin and Valeriy Shabelnikov.

He signed a contract with Ukrainian Premier League club FC Oleksandriya in July 2019 made his debut in the Ukrainian Premier League for Oleksandriya on 16 July 2020, playing as a start squad player in the winning away match against FC Desna Chernihiv.

References

External links 
Statistics at UAF website (Ukr)

2000 births
Living people
Footballers from Kyiv
Ukrainian footballers
FC Dynamo Kyiv players
FC Arsenal Kyiv players
FC Oleksandriya players
Ukrainian Premier League players
Association football defenders
Ukraine youth international footballers